Anne Emilie Poulsson (September 8, 1853 –  March 18, 1939) was an American children's author and campaigner for early childhood education and the kindergarten movement.

Poulsson was born in Cedar Grove, New Jersey . She was the daughter of Halvor Poulsson and Ruth Anne Poulsson (née Mitchell). Her father, who  was an immigrant from Norway, died when she was still young.  From the age of six months, she developed a serious eye condition resulting in visual impairment, which would eventually render her blind. She was taught to read at home and started at a public school at the age of eight, going on to high school at twelve. She learned braille at the Perkins School for the Blind in Watertown, Massachusetts.  For several years in her 20s, she lived with the family of composer and music educator Mabel Madison Watson. She later taught and lectured in Boston, Massachusetts. Poulsson was an advocate of the educationalist Friedrich Fröbel. She wrote and gave lectures on parenting, as well as writing  books for children. She made a number of trips to Norway and together with her sister Laura E. Poulsson, translated the works of others authors from the Norwegian language.

One of her poems from Rhyme Time for Children is sometimes quoted in support of literacy campaigns:

Bibliography
 Kindergarten and Primary School for the Blind co-written with Michael Anagnostopoulos (1884)
 Finger plays for nursery and kindergarten (1893)
 In the child's world (1893)
 Through the farmyard gate (1896)
 Love and Law in Child Training: A Book for Mothers (1899)
 The Runaway Donkey and Other Rhymes (1905)
 Top-of-the-World Stories for Boys and Girls (Translated from Scandinavian languages with Laura E. Poulsson, 1916)
 Rhyme time for children
 Baby's breakfast
 Mrs. Cat's dinner
 The Christmas Cake: A Story from Norway
 Holiday Songs And Every Day Songs And Games (1901)
 What Happened to Inger Johanne by Dikken Zwilgmeyer (Translation, 1919)

References

External links

 
 
 
 

1853 births
1939 deaths
Writers from New Jersey
Writers from Boston
People from Cedar Grove, New Jersey
American people of Norwegian descent
American children's writers
19th-century American women writers
19th-century American writers
American women children's writers
American blind people